Thomas Zündel (born 24 December 1987) is an Austrian footballer who plays for SV Tillmitsch.

External links
 
 https://www.weltfussball.at/teams/grazer-ak/2019/2/

1987 births
Living people
Austrian footballers
Association football defenders
FC Gratkorn players
SV Grödig players
Wolfsberger AC players
Grazer AK players
Austrian Football Bundesliga players
2. Liga (Austria) players
Austrian Regionalliga players